Sherway Gardens (corporately known as CF Sherway Gardens) is a large retail shopping mall in Toronto, Ontario, Canada.

Opened in 1971, the mall originally covered  in an S-shaped configuration and contained 127 stores. It is the eighth largest mall in the Greater Toronto Area, and is the 18th largest mall in Canada. As the mall has grown, it has changed its mix of stores from a general mix of stores to add more fashion-conscious and luxury brand stores.

History
Sherway Gardens, a  project, was revealed to the public by Sherway Gardens Limited on February 24, 1971. The mall was laid out in an "S" shape design. Like other shopping centres, Sherway Gardens contains fountains, indoor greenery, benches and couches for the enjoyment of shoppers. Unlike the designs of other malls, such as the Toronto Eaton Centre, Sherway Gardens was built with "intimate low ceilings".

In 1975, to accommodate for 75 new retail spaces, the "S" layout was altered to resemble a figure eight. In 1987, Holt Renfrew (one of Sherway Gardens anchor retailers) was moved to a location (33,670 square foot) in a newly built wing on the north side of the mall The expansion allowed for 20 additional stores and was later referred to as the "fashion wing", as it housed clothing stores.

In 1989, the mall continued to expand leading to the construction of a new south wing. The new south wing has a large 'tent-like' roof structure on its upper level. The million-dollar canopy, designed by Zeidler Roberts Partnership Architects, won the Canadian Consulting Engineering Award of Merit. In 2000, the Cadillac Fairview Corporation bought Sherway Gardens. Eaton's went bankrupt in 1999 and the mall space was taken over by Sears Canada.

2013–17 renovation/expansion

In 2013, Cadillac Fairview announced a  renovation and expansion that added 210,000 square feet to the existing 988,000 square foot mall. The project took over three and a half years and added new department store anchors like Nordstrom and Saks Fifth Avenue. This added retail space for 50 stores, a food court with a capacity of over 1,000 patrons, and a parking structure for 1,200 vehicles. The expansion used limestone obtained from the same quarry that was used in the mall's initial construction.

Sears Canada vacated its space in 2014, which was subsequently occupied by Saks Fifth Avenue (announced on January 27, 2014), Sport Chek and Atmosphere.

In 2016, Holt Renfrew closed its store just a year after being relocated within Sherway Gardens, in favour of a much larger 130,000+ square foot space at Square One Shopping Centre in Mississauga, as part of the chain's changing strategy to operate stores over 120,000 square feet to keep pace with Nordstrom and Saks Fifth Avenue. The former Sporting Life store and the old food court were demolished to make way for Nordstrom, which opened its store on September 15, 2017.

Retailers
The mall has a seasonal farmers' market, located in the north parking lot, every Friday 8 a.m.-2 p.m.. In the summer of 2023, Nordstrom will close permanently as chain is exiting Canada.

Transportation access
Sherway Gardens is the only major mall in Toronto not served by the Toronto subway. Kipling is the nearest subway station and can be reached by the 123 Sherway bus. Sherway is accessible by private automobile and local transit. Major roads in the area serving the mall include the Queen Elizabeth Way/Gardiner Expressway, The Queensway and Highway 427. The mall is surrounded by large surface parking lots with a ring road surrounding the mall. The Toronto Transit Commission and MiWay bus routes connect at special bus platforms located on either side of Sherway Gardens Road, southwest of the mall.

Incidents
On August 13, 2021, a fight between two groups in the mall escalated into shots being fired. In response, Sherway Gardens entered into lockdown.

In media
Parts of the movies F/X (1986), Mean Girls and The Sentinel (2006) were filmed in Sherway Gardens. In Mean Girls, Sherway Gardens stood in as Westfield Old Orchard (in the film mentioned as Old Orchard Mall), a large shopping centre in suburban Chicago where the film takes place.

References

External links

Etobicoke
Shopping malls in Toronto
Shopping malls established in 1971
Cadillac Fairview
1971 establishments in Ontario